The Riemann zeta function or Euler–Riemann zeta function, denoted by the Greek letter  (zeta), is a mathematical function of a complex variable defined as  for  and its analytic continuation elsewhere.

The Riemann zeta function plays a pivotal role in analytic number theory, and has applications in physics, probability theory, and applied statistics.

Leonhard Euler first introduced and studied the function over the reals in the first half of the eighteenth century. Bernhard Riemann's 1859 article "On the Number of Primes Less Than a Given Magnitude" extended the Euler definition to a complex variable, proved its meromorphic continuation and functional equation, and established a relation between its zeros and the distribution of prime numbers.  This paper also contained the Riemann hypothesis, a conjecture about the distribution of complex zeros of the Riemann zeta function that many mathematicians consider the most important unsolved problem in pure mathematics.

The values of the Riemann zeta function at even positive integers were computed by Euler. The first of them, provides a solution to the Basel problem. The values at negative integer points, also found by Euler, are rational numbers and play an important role in the theory of modular forms. Many generalizations of the Riemann zeta function, such as Dirichlet series, Dirichlet -functions and -functions, are known.

Definition

The Riemann zeta function  is a function of a complex variable . When , the function can be written as a converging summation or as an integral:

where 

is the gamma function.

Riemann showed that the function defined by the series on the half-plane of convergence can be continued analytically to all complex values .

Euler's product formula
In 1737, the connection between the zeta function and prime numbers was discovered by Euler, who proved the identity

The proof of Euler's identity uses only the formula for the geometric series and the fundamental theorem of arithmetic. Since the harmonic series, obtained when , diverges, Euler's formula (which becomes ) implies that there are infinitely many primes. On the other hand, combining that with the sieve of Erasthosthenes shows that the density of the set of primes within the set of positive integers is zero.

The Euler product formula can be used to calculate the asymptotic probability that  randomly selected integers are set-wise coprime. Now, for distinct primes, these divisibility events are mutually independent because the candidate divisors are coprime (a number is divisible by coprime divisors  and  if and only if it is divisible by , an event which occurs with probability ). Thus the asymptotic probability that  numbers are coprime is given by a product over all primes,

Riemann's functional equation 
This zeta function satisfies the functional equation

where  is the gamma function. This is an equality of meromorphic functions valid on the whole complex plane. When  is an even positive integer, the product  on the right is non-zero because  has a simple pole, which cancels the simple zero of the sine factor.

The functional equation was established by Riemann in his 1859 paper "On the Number of Primes Less Than a Given Magnitude" and used to construct the analytic continuation in the first place. An equivalent relationship had been conjectured by Euler over a hundred years earlier, in 1749, for the Dirichlet eta function (the alternating zeta function):

Incidentally, this relation gives an equation for calculating  in the region 0 <  < 1, i.e.

where the η-series is convergent (albeit non-absolutely) in the larger half-plane  (for a more detailed survey on the history of the functional equation, see e.g. Blagouchine).

Riemann also found a symmetric version of the functional equation applying to the xi-function:

which satisfies:

(Riemann's original  was slightly different.)

The  factor was not well-understood at the time of Riemann, until John Tate's (1950) thesis, in which it was shown that this so-called "Gamma factor" is in fact the local L-factor corresponding to the Archimedean place, the other factors in the Euler product expansion being the local L-factors of the non-Archimedean places.

Zeros, the critical line, and the Riemann hypothesis

These are called the trivial zeros. They are trivial in the sense that their existence is relatively easy to prove, for example, from  being 0 in the functional equation. The non-trivial zeros have captured far more attention because their distribution not only is far less understood but, more importantly, their study yields important results concerning prime numbers and related objects in number theory. It is known that any non-trivial zero lies in the open strip , which is called the critical strip. The set  is called the critical line. The Riemann hypothesis, considered one of the greatest unsolved problems in mathematics, asserts that all non-trivial zeros are on the critical line. In 1989, Conrey proved that more than 40% of the non-trivial zeros of the Riemann zeta function are on the critical line.

For the Riemann zeta function on the critical line, see -function.

Number of zeros in the critical strip
Trudgian proved that, if , then
.

The Hardy–Littlewood conjectures 
In 1914, Godfrey Harold Hardy proved that  has infinitely many real zeros.

In the following,  is the total number of real zeros and  the total number of zeros of odd order of the function  lying in the interval .

These two conjectures opened up new directions in the investigation of the Riemann zeta function.

Zero-free region 
The location of the Riemann zeta function's zeros is of great importance in number theory. The prime number theorem is equivalent to the fact that there are no zeros of the zeta function on the  line.

In 2015, Mossinghoff and Trudgian proved that zeta has no zeros in the region

The strongest result of this kind one can hope for is the truth of the Riemann hypothesis, which would have many profound consequences in the theory of numbers.

Other results 
It is known that there are infinitely many zeros on the critical line. Littlewood showed that if the sequence contains the imaginary parts of all zeros in the upper half-plane in ascending order, then

The critical line theorem asserts that a positive proportion of the nontrivial zeros lies on the critical line. (The Riemann hypothesis would imply that this proportion is 1.)

The fact that

for all complex  implies that the zeros of the Riemann zeta function are symmetric about the real axis. Combining this symmetry with the functional equation, furthermore, one sees that the non-trivial zeros are symmetric about the critical line .

It is also known that no zeros lie on a line with real part 1.

:

where  is Lambert W function.

Specific values

For any positive even integer ,

where  is the -th Bernoulli number.
For odd positive integers, no such simple expression is known, although these values are thought to be related to the algebraic -theory of the integers; see Special values of -functions.

For nonpositive integers, one has

In particular,  vanishes at the negative even integers because  for all odd  other than 1. These are the so-called "trivial zeros" of the zeta function.

Via analytic continuation, one can show that

This gives a pretext for assigning a finite value to the divergent series 1 + 2 + 3 + 4 + ⋯, which has been used in certain contexts (Ramanujan summation) such as string theory.  Analogously, the particular value

can be viewed as assigning a finite result to the divergent series 1 + 1 + 1 + 1 + ⋯.

The value
 
is employed in calculating kinetic boundary layer problems of linear kinetic equations.

Although

diverges, its Cauchy principal value

exists and is equal to the Euler–Mascheroni constant .

The demonstration of the particular value

is known as the Basel problem. The reciprocal of this sum answers the question: What is the probability that two numbers selected at random are relatively prime?
The value
 
is Apéry's constant.

Taking the limit  through the real numbers, one obtains . But at complex infinity on the Riemann sphere the zeta function has an essential singularity.

Various properties
For sums involving the zeta function at integer and half-integer values, see rational zeta series.

Reciprocal
The reciprocal of the zeta function may be expressed as a Dirichlet series over the Möbius function :

for every complex number  with real part greater than 1. There are a number of similar relations involving various well-known multiplicative functions; these are given in the article on the Dirichlet series.

Universality
The critical strip of the Riemann zeta function has the remarkable property of universality. This zeta function universality states that there exists some location on the critical strip that approximates any holomorphic function arbitrarily well. Since holomorphic functions are very general, this property is quite remarkable. The first proof of universality was provided by Sergei Mikhailovitch Voronin in 1975. More recent work has included effective versions of Voronin's theorem and extending it to Dirichlet L-functions.

Estimates of the maximum of the modulus of the zeta function
Let the functions  and  be defined by the equalities

 

Here  is a sufficiently large positive number, .

The case  was studied by Kanakanahalli Ramachandra; the case , where  is a sufficiently large constant, is trivial.

Anatolii Karatsuba proved, in particular, that if the values  and  exceed certain sufficiently small constants, then the estimates

 

The argument of the Riemann zeta function
The function

is called the argument of the Riemann zeta function.

There are some theorems on properties of the function .

on intervals of the real line, and also the theorem claiming that every interval  for

contains at least
 
points where the function  changes sign. Earlier similar results were obtained by Atle Selberg for the case

Representations

Dirichlet series
An extension of the area of convergence can be obtained by rearranging the original series. The series

Mellin-type integrals
The Mellin transform of a function  is defined as

in the region where the integral is defined. There are various expressions for the zeta function as Mellin transform-like integrals.

where  denotes the gamma function. By modifying the contour, Riemann showed that

for all  (where  denotes the Hankel contour).

We can also find expressions which relate to prime numbers and the prime number theorem. If  is the prime-counting function, then

 

Now 

These expressions can be used to prove the prime number theorem by means of the inverse Mellin transform. Riemann's prime-counting function is easier to work with, and  can be recovered from it by Möbius inversion.

Theta functions
The Riemann zeta function can be given by a Mellin transform

in terms of Jacobi's theta function

This gives the following expression for the zeta function, which is well defined for all  except 0 and 1:

Laurent series

The constants  here are called the Stieltjes constants and can be defined by the limit

 

The constant term  is the Euler–Mascheroni constant.

Integral 
Abel–Plana formula)

holds true, which may be used for a numerical evaluation of the zeta function.

Rising factorial
Another series development using the rising factorial valid for the entire complex plane is

This can be used recursively to extend the Dirichlet series definition to all complex numbers.

Hadamard product
On the basis of Weierstrass's factorization theorem, Hadamard gave the infinite product expansion

A simpler infinite product expansion is

(To ensure convergence in the latter formula, the product should be taken over "matching pairs" of zeros, i.e. the factors for a pair of zeros of the form  and  should be combined.)

Globally convergent series
A globally convergent series for the zeta function, valid for all complex numbers  except  for some integer , was conjectured by Konrad Knopp in 1926  and proven by Helmut Hasse in 1930 (cf. Euler summation):

The series appeared in an appendix to Hasse's paper, and was published for the second time by Jonathan Sondow in 1994.

Hasse also proved the globally converging series

in the same publication. Research by Iaroslav Blagouchine
has found that a similar, equivalent series was published by Joseph Ser in 1926.

Peter Borwein has developed an algorithm that applies Chebyshev polynomials to the Dirichlet eta function to produce a very rapidly convergent series suitable for high precision numerical calculations.

Series representation at positive integers via the primorial
 

Series representation by the incomplete poly-Bernoulli numbers

The Mellin transform of the Engel map
The function  is iterated to find the coefficients appearing in Engel expansions.

The Mellin transform of the map  is related to the Riemann zeta function by the formula

Thue-Morse sequence
Certain linear combinations of Dirichlet series whose coefficients are terms of the Thue-Morse sequence give rise to identities involving the Riemann Zeta function (Tóth, 2022 ). For instance:

where  is the  term of the Thue-Morse sequence.

Numerical algorithms 
A classical algorithm, in use prior to about 1930, proceeds by applying the Euler-Maclaurin formula to obtain, for n and m positive integers,

where, letting  denote the indicated Bernoulli number,

and the error satisfies

with σ = Re(s).

A modern numerical algorithm is the Odlyzko–Schönhage algorithm.

Applications
The zeta function occurs in applied statistics (see Zipf's law and Zipf–Mandelbrot law).

Zeta function regularization is used as one possible means of regularization of divergent series and divergent integrals in quantum field theory. In one notable example, the Riemann zeta function shows up explicitly in one method of calculating the Casimir effect. The zeta function is also useful for the analysis of dynamical systems.

Musical Tuning
In the theory of musical tunings, the zeta function can be used to find equal divisions of the octave (EDOs) that closely approximate the intervals of the harmonic series.

peaks near integers that correspond to such EDOs. Examples include popular choices such as 12, 19, and 53.

Infinite series
The zeta function evaluated at equidistant positive integers appears in infinite series representations of a number of constants. 

In fact the even and odd terms give the two sums

and

Parametrized versions of the above sums are given by

and

Other sums include

where  denotes the imaginary part of a complex number.

There are yet more formulas in the article Harmonic number.

Generalizations
There are a number of related zeta functions that can be considered to be generalizations of the Riemann zeta function. These include the Hurwitz zeta function

(the convergent series representation was given by Helmut Hasse in 1930, cf. Hurwitz zeta function), which coincides with the Riemann zeta function when  (the lower limit of summation in the Hurwitz zeta function is 0, not 1), the Dirichlet -functions and the Dedekind zeta function. For other related functions see the articles zeta function and -function.

The polylogarithm is given by

which coincides with the Riemann zeta function when . 

The Lerch transcendent is given by

The multiple zeta functions are defined by

One can analytically continue these functions to the -dimensional complex space. The special values taken by these functions at positive integer arguments are called multiple zeta values by number theorists and have been connected to many different branches in mathematics and physics.

See also
1 + 2 + 3 + 4 + ···
Arithmetic zeta function
Generalized Riemann hypothesis
Lehmer pair
Prime zeta function
Riemann Xi function
Renormalization
Riemann–Siegel theta function
ZetaGrid

Notes

References

 
 
 
  Has an English translation of Riemann's paper.
 
 
  (Globally convergent series expression.)
 

 
 
 
 
 
 . In Gesammelte Werke, Teubner, Leipzig (1892), Reprinted by Dover, New York (1953).

External links

 
 Riemann Zeta Function, in Wolfram Mathworld — an explanation with a more mathematical approach
 Tables of selected zeros
 Prime Numbers Get Hitched A general, non-technical description of the significance of the zeta function in relation to prime numbers.
 X-Ray of the Zeta Function Visually oriented investigation of where zeta is real or purely imaginary.
 Formulas and identities for the Riemann Zeta function functions.wolfram.com
 Riemann Zeta Function and Other Sums of Reciprocal Powers, section 23.2 of Abramowitz and Stegun
 
 Mellin transform and the functional equation of the Riemann Zeta function—Computational examples of Mellin transform methods involving the Riemann Zeta Function
 Visualizing the Riemann zeta function and analytic continuation a video from 3Blue1Brown

Zeta and L-functions
Analytic number theory
Meromorphic functions
Articles containing video clips
Bernhard Riemann